Michael Patrick MacDonald (born March 9, 1966) is an American activist against crime and violence and author of his memoir, All Souls: A Family Story From Southie. He is of Irish descent. He helped start Boston's gun-buyback program, and founded the South Boston Vigil group, which works with survivor families and young people in Boston's anti-violence movement.

He was the recipient of the 1999 Daily Point of Light Award, which honors those who connect Americans through community service. MacDonald has been awarded an Anne Cox Chambers Fellowship at the MacDowell Colony, a Bellagio Center Fellowship through the Rockefeller Foundation, and residencies at the Blue Mountain Center and Djerassi Artists Residency Program. He received the Courage of Conscience Award from the Peace Abbey for his courage and committed efforts to stem the tide of inner city violence through the establishment of the gun-buyback program in Boston.

He currently lives in Brooklyn, New York and devotes his time to writing and public speaking on topics ranging from "Race and Class in America" to "Trauma, Healing, and Social Change." MacDonald is a writer in Residence at Northeastern University in Boston.

Books

All Souls: A Family Story from Southie
 
A national bestseller, All Souls: A Family Story from Southie (Beacon Press, September 1999), won an American Book Award and a New England Literary Lights Award, as well as the Myers Outstanding Book Award administered by the Myers Center for the Study of Bigotry and Human Rights in North America.

With All Souls, MacDonald writes a gripping memoir about his life growing up in the Old Colony housing projects in South Boston, a predominantly white Irish Catholic neighborhood. He writes about the crime, drugs, and violence in his neighborhood in the years following Boston's busing riots, and of his brothers and sisters, several of whom fell prey to drugs, crime, and suicide. The book introduces his mother, Helen King, a feisty woman who raised her nine surviving children in the projects. The book often mentions Whitey Bulger, a gangster and FBI informant in Southie, who brought the drug trade into the neighborhood, contributing to the deaths of hundreds of young people because of suicides, murders, and overdoses. Despite the turmoil, MacDonald writes about how proud and loyal the residents were to be from Southie.

Easter Rising: An Irish American Coming Up from Under
Released in October 2006, Easter Rising: An Irish American Coming Up from Under continues MacDonald's personal story. It tells of his path out of Southie and the history of the 1980s punk subculture, punk ideologies, and post-punk music scenes. In addition, he speaks of meeting older family members.

References

External links
Michael Patrick MacDonald talks about his new book, All Souls, and changing times in South Boston The Boston Phoenix, by Sarah McNaught

1966 births
Living people
American memoirists
Writers from Boston
People from South Boston
American people of Irish descent
American activists
Writers from New York City
American Book Award winners